The United Nations Regional Information Centre (UNRIC) is one of 63 United Nations Information Centres (UNICs) around the world. Their main task is to spread the UN message, raise awareness and create understanding of issues relating to the United Nations' objectives. UNRIC serves the Western European Region by providing and disseminating UN information material, UN reports and documents, press kits, posters, fact sheets and brochures. The intention is to reach out to all segments of society and therefore the UNRIC Reference Library is open to all inquiries about the UN via telephone, e-mail and post. UN documents and publications are available in English, French and Spanish, but some material is also available in other European languages.

UNRIC maintains websites in 13 languages of the region: Danish, English, French, Finnish, German, Greek, Icelandic, Italian, Dutch, Norwegian, Portuguese, Swedish and Spanish. Each version presents basic information on the UN, its structure, goals, main documents, affiliated agencies, employment/internship opportunities and main areas of work. Moreover, it gives information about the most important UN related events, activities and international observances, as well as the programs of UNRIC and the UN family in the region.

UNRIC organizes information projects or campaigns with key partners, including governments, the media, NGOs, educational institutions and local authorities.

Countries served 
On 1 January 2004, the United Nations Regional Information Centre opened in Brussels, replacing the previous United Nations Information Centres in Athens, Bonn, Brussels, Copenhagen, Lisbon, London, Madrid, Paris and Rome which ceased operations on 31 December 2003. It has since provided services to the following Western European countries:
 

 
 
 
 
 
 
 
 
 
 
 
 
 
 
 
 
 
 
 
 
 
 

The United Nations also maintains information centres in other European Union states as well. The centre in Geneva serves Switzerland and also coordinates with the Geneva-based United Nations offices to inform the world about the importance of the organization in world affairs. The centre in Prague serves the Czech Republic, while the centre in Warsaw serves Poland. Meanwhile, the centre in Vienna liaises between the United Nations Office at Vienna and the world, as well as serving Austria, Hungary, Slovakia and Slovenia.

Desk Officers 
The main duty of a Desk Officer is the promotion of the UN system and its work in the country/countries of her/his responsibility. This can be achieved through the implementation of information campaigns, the dissemination of information materials and the publication of op-eds written by UN officials.

A Desk Officer is also responsible for arranging interviews, organizing press conferences and briefings and for monitoring the press coverage of UN issues.

The duties of a Desk Officer include the production of print information materials and the cooperation with key civil society partners at the national and regional level.

Reference library
The UNRIC library maintains a collection of UN documents and publications in English, French and Spanish, as well as general information material about the work of the United Nations. The library provides reference services via e-mail or telephone and is open to the public.

Campaigns and projects

CoolPlanet2009 
Cool Planet 2009 is the UN's European information campaign on climate change. The CoolPlanet website is the centrepiece of UNRIC's campaign, geared at generating interest and involvement in climate change issues in Europe and to mobilize citizens in support of a new climate agreement in Copenhagen in December 2009. The Wall of Events on the website is a marketplace for European ideas, innovations and projects. People can post their own climate initiatives and see what others are doing in Europe.

The web page was launched on 26 February 2006 by the Prime Minister of Iceland Jóhanna Sigurðardóttir on behalf of the Prime Ministers of the five Nordic countries at the Nordic Globalization Forum at the Blue Lagoon in Iceland.

Coolplanet2009 has joined forces with numerous "Cool Friends and Partners", such as Yann Arthus-Bertrand and Good Planet, the Icelandic rock band Sigur Rós, Björk's NGO Náttúra, and the three chairwomen of the Road to Copenhagen: Margot Wallström, Vice President of the European Commission; Gro Harlem Brundtland, UN Special Envoy on Climate Change; and Mary Robinson, former President of Ireland.

CoolPlanet2009 is the European branch of the global UN campaign Seal the Deal. CoolPlanet is also promoting the Seal the Deal in Europe through the concept "Wear Seal the Deal" in partnership with the Belgian designer Jean-Paul Knott. The concept features downloadable Seal the Deal campaign tools based on a do-it-yourself philosophy and includes Seal the Deal postcards, pins and T-shirts.

Seal the Deal 2009 
The UN-led global campaign Seal the Deal seeks to encourage governments to successfully conclude a fair, balanced and effective climate agreement at the Copenhagen climate conference from 7–18 December 2009. The campaign was launched on 5 June 2009, World Environment Day.

The Seal the Deal campaign aims to raise awareness on climate change and to emphasize that public pressure from around the globe is important to make politicians reach a deal by the time the meeting ends on December 18. To gather public support the Seal the Deal campaign encourages users to sign an online global petition which will be presented to world leaders. The petition will serve as a reminder that world leaders must negotiate a fair, balanced and effective agreement in Copenhagen, and that they must seal a deal to power green growth, protect our planet and build a more sustainable, prosperous global economy that will benefit all nations and all people.

Human Rights Education 
Human Rights Education is an UNRIC campaign that began in 2009 to celebrate the International Year for Learning Human Rights. The web-based campaign is to be a marketplace of ideas for teachers and students where they can download and access material, exchange experiences about teaching and studying human rights, and find contacts, links, partners as well as a wide variety of other practical and relevant information.

Cartooning for Peace 
The power and the responsibility of political cartooning was illustrated by the Muhammad cartoon debacle and the controversial cartoon exhibition on the Holocaust in Iran. Conceived by the French cartoonist Plantu, ‘Cartooning for Peace’ was born on 16 October 2006 at the UN Headquarters in New York. Twelve of the most renowned political cartoonists from all over the world participated in a two-day conference to help us ‘Unlearn intolerance.’ The conference was accompanied by an exhibition. A movement was born.

Development Policy Forum 
The Development Policy Forum (DPF) is a partnership between the Brussels-based think tank ‘Friends of Europe,’ the World Bank, the United Nations, the Agence Française de Développement (AFD), the UK’s Department for International Development (DFID) and the Deutsche Gesellschaft für Zusammenarbeit (GTZ). Support also comes from the Friedrich-Ebert-Stiftung (FES), the International Monetary Fund (IMF), and an association with the European Commission Directorate General for Development and Relations with African, Caribbean and Pacific Group of States (ACP). The goal of the partnership is to systematically address forthcoming challenges in the area of development policy through lively debates and written analyses.

The aims of the DPF are to:
 Raise awareness of development issues
 Promote debate on topical and interlinked political, economic and social matters
 Bring together political authorities, members of national, international and European development organisations, commentators and business representatives to discuss and debate development questions

CINE-ONU 
CINE-ONU is an event organized by UNRIC on a regular basis (usually once a month). It is open to the public and it is one of the most successful initiatives of UNRIC in Brussels. Its success has grown over the past few years and it is expected that in the near future it will reach an even larger audience. CINE-ONU involves the screening of a film relevant to a specific UN issue, followed by a debate with reputed speakers - either connected to the film, to the issue in question, or to both. Often, CINE-ONU is organized to raise awareness of a UN International Day and the issues involved (for example, the International Day for the Elimination of Violence against Women). CINE-ONUs are announced around two weeks in advance, via an internal mailing list, online platforms promoting similar events, and/or by putting up posters in universities and cultural centres. The purpose of CINE-ONU is to raise awareness and spark debate on UN-specific issues. It often offers the opportunity to its participants to see premieres of highly acclaimed documentaries and address questions to senior UN officials or other personalities.

UNRIC Magazine 
UNRIC Magazine provides an overview of UN-related events taking place in Western Europe. It also contains opinion pieces written by senior UN officials, an interview of the month, background material on recent major UN initiatives, an article from one of the staff members at UNRIC, new appointments and report launches. The magazine is published every month.

UN international days and observances

References

External links
 

United Nations Secretariat